Mark Lofgren (born June 26, 1961) is a member of the Iowa Senate, representing the 46th district. He was elected in 2016, defeating incumbent Democratic Senator Chris Brase.

He previously served as a member of the Iowa House of Representatives from 2011-2015  before giving up his seat for an unsuccessful bid for the Republican candidate for the Iowa's 2nd congressional district

Electoral history

References

External links 
 Mark Lofgren at Iowa Legislature
 
 Biography at Ballotpedia
 Campaign Website
Iowa Senate Republicans page

Living people
1961 births
University of Iowa alumni
Republican Party members of the Iowa House of Representatives
Republican Party Iowa state senators
21st-century American politicians